Country Is My Rock is the debut studio album of American country music artist Trent Tomlinson. It was released on March 7, 2006 (see 2006 in country music) on Lyric Street Records. The album produced three chart singles on the Billboard Hot Country Songs charts between 2005 and 2007: "Drunker Than Me" (No. 19), "One Wing in the Fire" (No. 11), and "Just Might Have Her Radio On" (No. 21). Tomlinson co-produced the album with Leigh Reynolds and "Hillbilly".

Track listing

Personnel

Mike Brignardello – bass guitar
Jim "Moose" Brown – keyboards
Chad Cromwell – drums
Eric Darken – percussion
Chip Davis – background vocals
Paul Franklin – pedal steel guitar
Mike "Frog" Griffith – production coordinator
Rob Hajacos – fiddle
Wes Hightower – background vocals
"Hillbilly" – producer
Dennis Holt – drums
Troy Lancaster – electric guitar
Greg Lawrence – assistant producer
Chris Leuzinger – acoustic guitar
Mike Logan – mixer
B. James Lowry – acoustic guitar
Brent Mason – electric guitar
Pat McGrath – acoustic guitar
Greg Morrow – drums
Gordon Mote – keyboards
Russ Pahl – lap steel guitar
Sang Park – assistant producer
Leigh Reynolds – electric guitar, producer
Michael Rhodes – bass guitar
Michael Rojas – keyboards
Marty Slayton – background vocals
Jimmie Lee Sloas – bass guitar
Trent Tomlinson – Dobro (track 1), lead vocals (all tracks), producer
Biff Watson – acoustic guitar

Chart performance

Weekly charts

Year-end charts

Singles

References

2006 debut albums
Lyric Street Records albums
Trent Tomlinson albums